The Accion U.S. Network is an American nonprofit microfinance organization headquartered in New York, NY. It is the largest and only nationwide nonprofit microfinance network in the U.S.

About
The Accion U.S. Network is part of Accion International, a U.S.-based nonprofit organization operating globally, with the mission of giving people the financial tools they need to create or grow healthy businesses. The domestic Accion programs started in Brooklyn, NY, and grew from there to become the first nationwide network microlender.

Member Offices
In addition to having lending offices in nearly 30 cities, Accion also offers online lending. Its four member offices are:

 Accion East
 Accion Chicago
 Accion New Mexico · Arizona · Colorado 
 Accion San Diego (now re-named Accessity and serving all of Southern California) 

Accion offers micro loans and other financial services to low- and moderate-income entrepreneurs in the United States who are typically unable to access bank credit to start or expand their small business. Services offered include a small business loan program, a "Credit Builder" loan program, and a financial literacy program offered in several languages. In addition, Accion’s national partnerships with Samuel Adams Brewing the American Dream, Sam’s Club, Citi Salutes: Realizing Your Dream, and The Hartford: Communities with HART offer Accion’s clients a wide range of opportunities and support for growth, such as personalized business coaching, business seminars, and regional and national competitions.

20th Anniversary
In 2014, Accion celebrated 20 years of supporting small businesses in America.  The anniversary marked 20 years of “firsts” with Accion being the first microlender in the U.S. to provide credit reports to all three bureaus, the first to provide online microlending, and the first to provide nationwide underwriting.

Operational Statistics
The Accion U.S. Network is the largest of its kind in the United States, having made nearly 50,000 loans, totaling over $450 million with a 90% loan repayment rate as of January 2014. In addition, Accion lends over $3.7 million to small businesses a month. Accion works with groups that might not qualify for traditional financing, such as women, minorities, and immigrants, to give them the financial tools they need to build their business.

Accion’s outcomes data from its 2013 microTracker survey, which was conducted in partnership with the Aspen Institute and California microlender Opportunity Fund, showed that: 
 4.8 jobs were created or sustained on average by businesses with employees
 97% of businesses remained open one year after receiving a loan despite challenging economic times
 47% reported satisfaction with income earned from their business
Accion's 2021 Annual Report states that since its founding, Accion has helped build and strengthen more than 200 institutions operating across 63 countries. In 2021, Accion reported that its efforts provided more than 15 million people with access to credit through its partners, which positively impacted 220 million people.

Awards and acknowledgements
Since its inception, Accion has won numerous regional and national awards and acknowledgements for its success in microlending. Collectively, the member offices received the 1997 Presidential Award for Excellence in Microenterprise Development as part of the Accion U.S. Network.  In addition, they have been awarded several grants from the Community Development Financial Institution and the U.S. Department of Housing and Urban Development. Awards include:
 CDFI Fund Awards
 4-star ratings from Charity Navigator
 The 2009 New York City Neighborhood Achievement Award for Minority/Women-owned Business Enterprise Advocate of the Year
 The 2007 Wells Fargo NEXT Award for Opportunity Finance
 The 2007 Small Business Advocate of The Year Award from the Greater Albuquerque Chamber of Commerce
 The NOVO Award from the Greater Miami Chamber of Commerce
 The 2004 VIVA Award for Vision, Investment, Vitality, and Action from the New Mexico Association of Commerce and Industry 
 The 2002 Deutsche Bank Award for Excellence in Lending

References

External links
Accion U.S. Network
Accion East
Accion Chicago
Accion Accion New Mexico · Arizona · Colorado
Accion San Diego
Accion International

Microfinance organizations